COSFAP Antananarivo is a Malagasy football club based in Antananarivo, Madagascar. The team has won the THB Champions League in 1988, qualifying them for the 1989 African Cup of Champions Clubs.

The team currently plays in the Malagasy Second Division.

Achievements
THB Champions League: 1
1988

Performance in CAF competitions
CAF Champions League: 1 appearance
1989 African Cup of Champions Clubs - first round

References

External links

site du club: http://www.cosfa-foot.com
Football clubs in Madagascar
Antananarivo